CHUR-FM is a Canadian radio station, which broadcasts a hot adult contemporary format at 100.5 FM in North Bay, Ontario. The station uses the on-air brand KiSS 100.5.

History
The station was launched in 1984 by Gateway City Broadcasting, at 1110 AM. It was subsequently acquired in 1985 by Mid-Canada Radio, who also changed the station's frequency to 840. In 1990, the station was acquired by the Pelmorex Radio Network.

Pelmorex converted the station to FM in 1994, and sold it to Telemedia in 1999. Under Telemedia's ownership, the station adopted the "EZ Rock" brand.

In 2002, Telemedia was acquired by Standard Broadcasting, and CHUR was one of the stations sold by Standard to Rogers Radio.

In July 2010, the station altered its musical format to present a more contemporary version of its AC Mainstream Plus blend more in line with the Hot AC version of American Top 40 with Ryan Seacrest. With this shift, the station cancelled The 80's Lunch program and Sunday at the 70's. Solid Gold Saturday Night was replaced by AT40. In July 2011, the station adopted a new logo as well as the slogan "Today's Best Music".

By January 2012, more hot adult contemporary and rhythmic contemporary hits were added to the playlist. The station also unveiled the HitStorm countdown, based out of Toronto's CKIS-FM. In March 2012, all of the Rogers-owned "EZ Rock" stations in Northern Ontario started to air the Top 20 Most Wanted, a countdown show produced by CJMX-FM in Sudbury. By June 2012, the station dropped the entire 1980s library and most pre-2000 music from its playlist, making it one of the few AC stations to not follow the adult contemporary pattern.

CHUR was one of four EZ Rock-branded stations owned and operated by Rogers Media, all of which are located in Northern Ontario (the others being CJMX-FM Sudbury, CHAS-FM Sault Ste. Marie, and CKGB-FM Timmins). On August 29, 2013, all four "EZ Rock" stations rebranded to "Kiss", discarding the "EZ Rock" branding now owned by Bell Media Radio.

In 2020, CHUR changed its moniker to "The New KiSS 100.5", but kept the same slogan and format. The station began carrying the Roz and Mocha Show from CKIS-FM Toronto which also airs on other Rogers-owned "Kiss" stations across Canada.

References

External links
KiSS 100.5
 

Hur
Hur
Hur
Radio stations established in 1984
1984 establishments in Ontario